Ad Turres was an ancient city of Etruria. Ad Turres stood on the Via Aurelia, 10 miles from Lorium and 12 miles from Pyrgi.  The location of Ad Turres is not precisely known; the editors of the Barrington Atlas of the Greek and Roman World tentatively place it near Palidoro, comune of Rome, Province of Rome, Lazio, Italy. The site is included on the Peutinger Table.

Sources
Hazlitt's Classical Gazetteer

References

Etruscan cities
Roman towns and cities in Italy
Former populated places in Italy